Nocera Umbra is a town and comune in the province of Perugia, Italy, 15 kilometers north of Foligno, at an altitude of 520 m above sea-level. The comune, covering an area of 157.19 km², is one of the largest in Umbria.

History

Ancient Age

The town of Nocera was founded in the 7th century BC by inhabitants from Camerinum, an Umbrian town, who left their ancestral homeland during a so-called ver sacrum (sacred spring), that is the deduction of a colony. The name of the town in the Osco-Umbrian language was Noukria, meaning "New" (town).

The Roman town was not located on the hill - where modern Nocera lies - but in the valley, near the Topino river.

The town - with the Latin name Nuceria Camellaria (or Camellana) – came under Roman control between the end of the 4th century and the first decades of the 3rd century BC, and became a Municipium. It soon acquired strategic importance because it lay on a branch of the via Flaminia, the road which linked Rome to the Adriatic, stretching from Forum Flamini (S. Giovanni Profiamma, near Foligno) to Fanum, on the Picenum.  according to another interpreatation, Nuceria Favoniense could be another town (today's Pievefavonica), located not far from today's Nocera. Several remains of the Roman roads are still visible today. From Nuceria the Romans also built another road – the Septempedana - leading to the Roman military outposts of Prolaqueum and Septempeda, on the Adriatic side of the Apennines.

According to Pliny the Elder, Nuceria was inhabited by two tribes, one the Nucerini Favonienses (faithful of Favonia, also named Fauna, a Goddess) and the other Camellani (originating from Camerinum, or possibly makers of camellae, small wooden containers). Strabo records that the town was famous for the production of wooden vases (possibly barrels).

During the second Punic war, in 217 BC, Hannibal, on his way to the Adriatic after the battle of Trasimeno, is said to have camped with his army near the town (in a place still known as Affrica).
Near Nuceria, on the shores of what is now the dried up  Lacus Plestinus, the commander of the Roman cavalry, Gaius Centenius, fought a battle with 4,000 knights against Carthaginian troops headed by Maharbal.

The town reached the height of its prosperity during the first two centuries AD.

During the 5th century, the diocese of Nocera was established.

The Roman town was destroyed at the beginning of the 5th century, possibly  by the Visigoths of Alaric, on their way to Rome: the survivors rebuilt their homes on top of the hill, where today's Nocera still stands.

Middle Ages
The Lombards occupied the town and stationed an Arimannia there, then a Gastaldatus and finally, at the beginning of the 9th century (during the Frankish period) it became a county. The walled town – it was named arx fortissima in contemporary documents - guarded the northern border of the Duchy of Spoleto against the Byzantine garrison at Gualdo Tadino. The importance of Nocera during the Lombard period is underlined by the Necropolis excavated in 1897, whose artefacts – weapons, jewels, household utensils, ceramics - form the core of the Museo dell'alto Medioevo in Rome.

During the Middle Ages Nocera became a walled town, very much as it exists today.

In 1202 the town came under the control of Perugia, and in 1248 it was destroyed by emperor Frederick II. A few years later it was destroyed by a large earthquake. Shortly thereafter it came into the possession of the Trinci of Foligno.

In 1421 the Castellan of Nocera, Pietro di Rasiglia, suspecting his wife of adultery with Niccolò I Trinci, invited the whole Trinci family to a hunting party and had them all killed, except the young Corrado, who took revenge for the murder of his relatives, attacking the town and killing the treacherous castellan.

In 1439 Cardinal Giovanni Vitelleschi crushed the Trinci's Signoria, and Nocera was annexed to the Papal States.

Modern Ages
The town, with the exception of the Napoleonic period, remained under papal control until 1860 when, as a part of Umbria, it was annexed to the Kingdom of Italy and assigned to the Province of Perugia in Umbria.

The town and the surrounding hamlets have been struck several times by earthquakes. The major ones took place on April 30, 1279, April 17, 1747, and September 26, 1997. The damage caused by the last of these has been fully repaired in 2016.

Main sights

A characteristic medieval town perched on a hill and famous for the quality of its water springs  Angelica (Six kilometers south-east of the town  in the frazione of Bagni) and Cacciatore, exported to Constantinople in the 17th century, it has several historical monuments:

Campanaccio: The town is dominated by the large tower that is the symbol of the town, the only remnant of the sturdy fortress of its Gastalds, then its Counts, dating back to the 11th century. The building commemorates the massacre of the Trinci family, which took place in 1421. The tower was almost completely destroyed by the 1997 earthquake (only part of one side remained standing) and rebuilt.
Co-cathedral of the Assumption: Of the ancient church, incorporated into the fortress, only the 10th-century portal remains. The building was rebuilt in the 15th century and renovated several times in the 18th and 19th centuries.
Church of San Francesco: Of great artistic importance, it was built in Romanesque-Gothic style in the 14th century. It contains frescoes by Matteo da Gualdo and houses the Municipal Art Gallery, with works by Niccolò Alunno, the Maestro di San Francesco and the school of Cimabue. The museum also houses artefacts from the Roman era, including a milestone on the Via Flaminia to Ancona, a female portrait, mosaic fragments, a 3rd-century memorial stone and parts of a funerary monument decorated with four Greek inscriptions, by Bishop Varino Favorino da Camerino, a famous Greek scholar who published one of the first dictionaries of the Greek language and was Greek teacher at the Medici court in Florence for the future Popes Leo X and Clement VII and also held the chair of Greek at the University of Rome.
In the Museo dell'alto Medioevo in Rome, there are important artefacts found at the end of the 19th century in almost two hundred Longobard tombs, from the 6th and 7th centuries, from the Arimannia settled in the territory of Nocera.

The principal mountain of the commune is the Monte Pennino with an altitude of 1,575 m. The town is dominated by the Monte Alago, whose meadows are the destination of walks.

Infrastructure and transport

Roads
The municipality is served by the SS 3 Flaminia rebuilt as a variant through the junctions of Nocera Scalo, Nocera Umbra and Colle/Gaifana.

Railways
Nocera is served by the Rome–Ancona railway line, on which the station of the same name (in the frazione Nocera Scalo) is located.

Frazioni
Acciano, Africa, Aggi, Bagnara, Bagni, Boschetto, Boschetto Basso, Capannacce, Casaluna, Casa Paoletti, Case, Case Basse, Castiglioni, Castrucciano, Cellerano, Colle, Collebrusco, Colle Croce, Colpertana, Colsaino, Gaifana, Isola, La Costa, Lanciano, Largnano, Le Moline, Maccantone, Mascionchie, Molina, Molinaccio, Montecchio, Mosciano, Mugnano, Nocera Scalo, Nocera Umbra Stazione, Pettinara, Ponte Parrano, Salmaregia, Schiagni, Sorifa, Stravignano, Villa di Postignano, Ville Santa Lucia.

Twin towns
 Frosinone, Italy
 Gabicce Mare, Italy

Sources

References

Cities and towns in Umbria
Hilltowns in Umbria